Kim Andersen (born 10 February 1958 in Malling, Denmark) is a former professional Danish road bicycle racer and current cycling team directeur sportif. From 2004 to 2010, he was a directeur sportif for Danish ProTour Team Saxo Bank. From 2011, he holds the same position at the Leopard Trek team.

Rider
In 1983 he became the first Dane to wear the yellow jersey in the Tour de France, and later won stages in that race. He has also sported stage wins in Vuelta a España, Four Days of Dunkirk, Ronde van Nederland, Midi Libre and Tour de Suisse, as well as numerous individual wins, 31 during his career. In 1984 he won the semi-classic Flèche Wallonne.

Doping
Kim Andersen was tested positive for doping in 1987, and was banned for life, a sentence that was later changed to a one-year quarantine. In 1992 he was tested positive again, and fired from his team.  He rode as an individual for the rest of the year, before finally retiring.

Major results

1980
 Stage 3, Ronde van Nederland
1981
 Stage 10, Vuelta a España:
 GP Cannes
1982
 Stage 3, Ronde van Nederland
 Stage 4, Four Days of Dunkirk
 Stage 3, Midi Libre
 Stage 3, Tour de l'Aude
1983
 Danmark Rundt
 Trophée des Grimpeurs
 GP Monaco
 Stage 12, Tour de France
1984
 La Flèche Wallonne
 Grand Prix d'Isbergues
 Danmark Rundt
 Stage 1A and overall, Tour du Limousin
 Stage 4, Four Days of Dunkirk
1985
 Stage 2, Danmark Rundt
 Stage 5A, Étoile des Espoirs
1986
 Paris–Camembert
 Stage 3A, Tour of Ireland
1987 (tested positive for doping usage)  National Champion
 Scandinavian Champion
 Paris–Bourges
 Danmark Rundt
 Stage 4, Tour de Limousin
 Stage 3, Étoile de Bessèges
 Stage 1 and 2, Tour de Bouges
1990
 GP de Cholet-Pays-de-Loire
 Stage 10, Tour de Suisse
1991
 GP de Rennes
 Tour de Poitou-Charentes et de la Vienne

Sports director
Andersen was hired as sports director of newly started Danish team Team Chicky World from 1998 until the closing of the team in 1999, after which he went to Team Fakta. After Team Fakta closed in 2003 he switched to Danish Team CSC (later Team Saxo Bank). He left in June 2010 to become founding directeur sportif of Leopard Trek, which became a licensed ProTour team for the 2011 season.

See also
List of sportspeople sanctioned for doping offences

References

External links

 Trap Friis Profile
 Team CSC Profile

1958 births
Living people
Danish male cyclists
Danish Tour de France stage winners
Danish Vuelta a España stage winners
Danish sportspeople in doping cases
Doping cases in cycling
Directeur sportifs
Danmark Rundt winners
People from Aarhus Municipality
Tour de Suisse stage winners
Trek–Segafredo (men's team)
Sportspeople from the Central Denmark Region